Union of Communist Youth in Service of the People was the youth wing of the Union of Italian Communists (Marxist-Leninist). The foundation of the organization was announced in a press statement in their organ, Servire il popolo (Serve the people). The leader of the movement was Aldo Brandirali.

Youth wings of communist parties
Youth wings of political parties in Italy